Brockville Regional Tackaberry Airport , also known as Brockville Municipal Airport, is a registered aerodrome located in Elizabethtown-Kitley Township,  northwest of the city of Brockville, Ontario, Canada.

This aerodrome is named after George Tackaberry, the owner of the company that re-surfaced and extended the runway and surrounding area in 2004.

The aerodrome has gliding activity for three weekends in the fall and three weekends in spring. This is done through the air cadets with glider pilots who either instruct at, or graduated from, the glider pilot scholarship. (The scholarship is a six-week summer course, which after completion candidates receive their glider pilot licence.) The Eastern Ontario Gliding Centre, which for the remainder of the spring and fall seasons operates out of Mountainview airport (CPZ3) near Trenton, Ontario, brings two gliders and one tow plane to Brockville for the three weekends.

References

External links
Brockville Regional Tackaberry Airport (official website)

Registered aerodromes in Ontario
Transport in Brockville
Buildings and structures in Brockville